The Vocabulario de la lengua bicol (Spanish for Vocabulary of the Bicol language) is a list of vocabulary of the Bicol language, collected by Marcos de Lisboa when he was assigned to Bicol Region, Philippines.

Lisboa, a Franciscan friar, resided in the Philippines from 1586 until 1618. He served in Ambos Camarines, where Bicol was widely spoken, from sometime between 1592 and 1602 until 1616. Lisboa died in Mexico in 1628. The  Vocabulario was first published posthumously in 1754, with a second edition in 1856. It contained 10,495 (Bikol-Español) word entries in 417 pages using  x  paper and 5,588 entries in the (Español-Bicol) section in 103 pages. Realubit describes the Bicol vocabulary as "broad in social scale and localization", but criticizes Lisboa's presentation of grammatical tense, affixes, and parts of speech.

References

Further reading

External links

Bikol languages
Filipino dictionaries